"Lovers on the Sun" is a song by French music producer David Guetta from his sixth studio album, Listen. It features vocals by American singer and songwriter Sam Martin. It was released as a digital download and the lead single from the album on 30 June 2014. It was produced by Guetta, Avicii, Riesterer, and Tuinfort, with additional production from Italian house production team Daddy's Groove. The track crowned the singles chart in Austria, Finland, Germany and the United Kingdom, and reached the top 40 in most of the countries where it charted.

Mallory Knox covered the song on BBC Radio 1's Live Lounge.

Background
This song and other songs from Listen were inspired by Spaghetti Western film scores.

Composition
"Lovers on the Sun" is a country, folk and EDM song. Mike Einziger of the band Incubus, who also played on Avicii's "Wake Me Up", also plays guitar on this track. The song is written in the key of B minor, at a tempo of 125 beats per minute. The chord progression of the chorus (Bm/D/F#m/E) bears similarity to Daft Punk's 2013 single "Get Lucky".

Music video
A lyric video was produced for the song with a Wild West theme.
An accompanying music video was released on 12 August 2014 again with a Wild West theme. It was directed by Marc Klasfeld, and stars Ray Liotta who portrays a villain and Jamie Gray Hyder, portraying a hero "the Sexy" rescuing Andrew Keegan "the Good". Idolator said the video was "refreshing" and called it "a special effects-filled extravaganza".

Critical reception
4Music celebrated the song's "double DJ power" (Guetta and Avicii, who co-wrote and co-produced the track) and suggested that it "must mean this'll be a big hit".

Track listing

Credits and personnel

David Guetta – songwriter, producer, instruments
Sam Martin – songwriter, guitar
Frédéric Riesterer – instruments, producer, songwriter
Giorgio Tuinfort – songwriter, producer, instruments, piano
Jason Evigan – songwriter, guitar
Michael Einziger – songwriter, guitar
Avicii (Tim Bergling) – songwriter, producer, instruments, piano
Daddy's Groove – additional producer, programming, mixer
Ralph Wegner – sound designer
Xavier Stephenson – recording engineer
Aaron Ahmad – recording engineer
Paul Power – orchestra recording, orchestra mixer
Franck van der Heijden – orchestra arrangement, conductor
Ben Mathot – first violin
Floortje Beljon – first violin
Ian de Jong – first violin
Inger van Vliet – first violin
Marleen Veldstra – first violin

Sara de Vries – first violin
Sofie van der Pol – first violin
Tseroeja van den Bos – first violin
Diewertje Wanders – second violin
Elise Noordhoek – second violin
Judith Eisenhardt – second violin
Judith van Driel – second violin
Maartje Korver – second violin
Marleen Wester – second violin
Annemarie Hensens – alt violin
Bram Faber – alt violin
Mark Mulder – alt violin
Yanna Pelser – alt violin
David Faber – cello
Jascha Bordon – cello
Thomas van Geelen – cello
Hinse Mutter – bass
Jesse Feves – bass

Credits adapted from CD single.

Charts

Weekly charts

Year-end charts

Certifications

Release history

References

2014 singles
2014 songs
David Guetta songs
Song recordings produced by Avicii
Songs written by Avicii
Songs written by David Guetta
Songs written by Frédéric Riesterer
Songs written by Giorgio Tuinfort
Songs written by Jason Evigan
Songs written by Sam Martin (singer)
Parlophone singles
Music videos directed by Marc Klasfeld
Number-one singles in Austria
Number-one singles in Finland
Number-one singles in Germany
Number-one singles in Scotland
UK Singles Chart number-one singles
Song recordings produced by David Guetta